The 1984–85 season was the 105th season of competitive football in England.

The season saw Everton build on their FA Cup success of the previous season by winning their first league title for 15 years and their first European silverware in the form of the European Cup Winners' Cup. However, they lost the FA Cup final to Manchester United. Norwich City won the Football League Cup but were relegated from the First Division.

However, the season was overshadowed by three tragedies involving English clubs. On 11 May 1985, the last day of the league season, a teenage spectator was killed at the St Andrew's stadium in a Second Division clash between Birmingham City and Leeds United in another incident of hooliganism which continued to blight English football at home and abroad. A far worse tragedy occurred on the same day when a fire ripped through the stadium of Third Division champions Bradford City, killing 56 spectators. On 29 May, at the European Cup Final in Brussels, rioting by Liverpool fans led to the collapse of a wall and 39 spectators (most of them Italian) were crushed or trampled to death in the panic. Shortly after the game, which Juventus of Italy won 1–0, all English clubs were banned from European competitions for an indefinite period, which ended up being 6 years for Liverpool and 5 years for every other English football club.

Bradford City stadium fire

56 spectators died and more than 200 were injured when a fire ripped through the Main Stand at Valley Parade during Bradford City's Third Division fixture with Lincoln City on 11 May. This tragedy was seen by many as a wake-up call for English clubs to improve the state of their grounds and take more drastic safety measures to bring an end to problems which had been plaguing the game for years without any effective action being taken.

Heysel disaster

Less than three weeks after the Bradford fire, 39 spectators (mostly Italian) were trampled to death on the terraces of Heysel Stadium where Liverpool took on Juventus in the European Cup final. As a result, all English clubs were banned indefinitely from European competition with Liverpool ordered to serve an extra three years whenever the other English sides were re-admitted. Despite the tragedy, the match was played and Juventus beat Liverpool 1–0.

Diary of the season 

18 August 1984: Everton win the Charity Shield by beating Merseyside rivals Liverpool 1–0 at Wembley. The only goal is inadvertently deflected into his own net by Reds' goalkeeper Bruce Grobbelaar.

25 August 1984: The new league season has an early start as the London derby between Arsenal and Chelsea kicks off at 11:30am on police advice. The match ends in a 1–1 draw in front of over 45,000 at Highbury. Three penalties (one missed) and an own goal at Carrow Road where Norwich City come from 2–0 and 3–2 down to hold champions Liverpool to a 3–3 draw. Manchester United are pegged back by an 89th minute Watford equaliser at Old Trafford. Everton crash 4–1 at home to Tottenham Hotspur for whom debutants Clive Allen and John Chiedozie are among the scorers. In the Second Division, newly promoted Oxford United win 3–0 at Huddersfield Town but Wimbledon are held to a 2–2 draw by Manchester City after leading 2–0. Biggest winners of the day are Exeter City who beat Northampton Town 5–0 in Division Four.

27 August 1984: Newcastle United and Aston Villa both have two wins from their opening two matches but Stoke City and Everton are still looking for their first point. Paul Walsh scores after 14 seconds of his home debut for Liverpool, a 3–0 win over West Ham United.

31 August 1984: Everton get off the mark with a 1–0 win at Chelsea who were previously unbeaten since January.

1 September 1984: Newcastle beat Aston Villa 3–0 to top the league with the First Division's only 100% record after three games. Crowd trouble interrupts the match between Coventry City and Leicester City at Highfield Road. Peter Davenport scores a hat-trick as Nottingham Forest beat Sunderland 3–1 and Derby County's Kevin Wilson also scores three in his side's 3–2 win over Bolton Wanderers. Earlier in the week, Wilson scored four in a Milk Cup tie against Hartlepool United.

4 September 1984: Newcastle drop their first points in a 2–0 defeat at Arsenal. Tottenham have Graham Roberts and Clive Allen sent off as they lose 1–0 at Sunderland.

5 September 1984: Nottingham Forest go top after a Trevor Christie hat-trick helps them to a resounding 5–0 win at Aston Villa.

8 September 1984: Arsenal head Division One for the first time since February 1973 following their 3–1 win over Liverpool at Highbury. Manchester United beat Newcastle 5–0 to register their first win after four draws.

15 September 1984: Clive Allen scores twice against his former club as Tottenham beat Queens Park Rangers 5–0 to displace North London rivals Arsenal from top spot. The Gunners are beaten 2–1 at Ipswich Town. At Stamford Bridge, Chelsea's Colin Lee sees his penalty saved by West Ham keeper Tom McAlister but scores from the rebound. Referee Trevor Spencer orders a retake – Lee's second effort is also saved but he again scores from the rebound. The home side go on to win 3–0.

16 September 1984: Nottingham Forest return to the top with a 3–1 win over Luton Town at the City Ground.

18 September 1984: Back in European competition for the first time in eight years, QPR enjoy a 3–0 first leg win over KR Reykjavík in the UEFA Cup. Second Division leaders Birmingham City drop their first points of the season, beaten 1–0 at home by Portsmouth.

19 September 1984: Liverpool begin their defence of the European Cup with a 1–0 win over Lech Poznań in Poland. In the UEFA Cup, Manchester United and Tottenham enjoy comfortable wins but Nottingham Forest and Southampton both draw at home. Everton are surprisingly held by University College Dublin in the Cup Winners' Cup. The last two 100% league records come to an end as Hereford United draw with Chester City and Chesterfield lose at Hartlepool.

22 September 1984: QPR and Newcastle draw an extraordinary match 5–5 at Loftus Road. Newcastle led 4–0 at half-time with Chris Waddle contributing a hat-trick and were 5–3 up with just five minutes remaining. John Deehan scores three in Norwich's 3–2 win over Watford at Carrow Road. In the same fixture last season, Deehan scored four.

24 September 1984: Milk Cup holders Liverpool are held to a goalless draw in the first leg of their second round tie with Stockport County at Edgeley Park.

25 September 1984: Nottingham Forest are the only First Division side beaten in tonight's Milk Cup matches. They lose 1–0 at Portsmouth. John Barnes scores a hat-trick as Watford win for the first time this season, beating Cardiff City 3–1.

26 September 1984: Struggling Stoke lose 2–1 at home to Rotherham United in the Milk Cup. Young Welsh forward Mark Hughes scores his first senior hat-trick in Manchester United's 4–0 win over Burnley. Garth Crooks also scores three as league leaders Tottenham win 5–1 at Halifax Town.

29 September 1984: Another day of high scoring in today's fixtures – 153 goals at an average of more than three per match. Plymouth Argyle beat Preston North End 6–4 and Everton win by the odd goal in nine at Watford who slip to the bottom of the First Division. Leeds United beat Oldham Athletic 6–0 with Andy Ritchie scoring three. Other hat-trick heroes include Gary Stevens of Shrewsbury Town and Barnsley's David Geddis. Arsenal's veteran goalkeeper Pat Jennings saves a Kenny Hibbitt penalty in his side's 2–1 win at Coventry. Liverpool in turmoil – Grobbelaar has a nightmare as Sheffield Wednesday beat them 2–0 at Anfield. The champions have won only two of their eight league matches this season.

2 October 1984: QPR easily make it through to the second round of the UEFA Cup with a 4–0 win over KR Reykjavik, 7–0 on aggregate. The match is played at Arsenal as UEFA will not allow Rangers to use their artificial pitch at Loftus Road. Everton beat University College Dublin in the Cup Winners' Cup but only thanks to a single Graeme Sharp goal at Goodison Park. Fourth Division leaders Hereford concede their first league goals of the season in their eighth match, a 3–1 defeat at Chesterfield.

3 October 1984: Forest and Southampton are knocked out of Europe but Liverpool, Manchester United and Tottenham all make progress. John Wark scores a hat-trick as Liverpool beat Lech Poznań 4–0 and Garth Crooks bags three for the second successive week in Spurs' 6–0 win over Braga.

6 October 1984: Arsenal are back on top of the table – a Charlie Nicholas penalty gives them victory over Everton while Tottenham lose 1–0 at Southampton. Liverpool's woes continue as West Bromwich Albion hold them to a goalless draw at Anfield. The last unbeaten record in Division One goes as Manchester United lose 3–0 at Aston Villa. On-loan French winger Didier Six stars on his Villa debut. With Oxford losing 1–0 at Manchester City – their first defeat away from home since February – Portsmouth are now the only side yet to be beaten in the league this season.

9 October 1984: Coventry crash out of the Milk Cup, beaten 3–0 at home by last season's semi-finalists Walsall, 4–2 on aggregate. Liverpool need extra time to put out Stockport.

12 October 1984: Tottenham move ahead of Arsenal on goal difference at the top of the table with a 1–0 win over Liverpool.

13 October 1984: Arsenal return to the summit with a 4–1 win at Leicester. Manchester United remain in touch with a 5–1 win over West Ham. Watford, the only side without a league win this season, break their duck by beating Chelsea 3–2 at Stamford Bridge.

14 October 1984: Cardiff move off the bottom of Division Two at the expense of Notts County with a 2–0 win at Meadow Lane.

20 October 1984: A watershed moment in the season as Everton win at Anfield for the first time in 14 years. Graeme Sharp scores the only goal with a brilliant volley. Arsenal unveil their new 18ft x 14ft video screen for extra match day entertainment, the first of its kind in English football. On the pitch, the Gunners beat Sunderland 3–2 to retain top spot. Tottenham slip to fifth after defeat at Old Trafford while Sheffield Wednesday move up to second with a 5–0 win over Leicester. Portsmouth suffer their first league defeat, losing 3–2 at Wimbledon.

24 October 1984: In only his second match back following a knee operation, Ian Rush scores a hat-trick in Liverpool's 3–1 European Cup win over Benfica. Everton win at Fortuna Sittard in the Cup Winners' Cup through an early goal by Paul Bracewell. In the UEFA Cup, QPR beat Partizan Belgrade 6–2 at Highbury but Tottenham lose in Bruges with Glenn Hoddle sent off and Manchester United draw with PSV in Eindhoven.

27 October 1984: In-form Everton thrash Manchester United 5–0, United's biggest margin of defeat since losing 6–0 at Ipswich in March 1980. Leaders Arsenal are beaten 3–1 at West Ham. Tottenham nail Stoke to the bottom of the First Division with a 4–0 win at White Hart Lane. Leicester striker Gary Lineker scores a hat-trick in his side's 5–0 win over Aston Villa.

28 October 1984: Having slipped into the bottom three, Liverpool begin the climb to safety with a 2–0 win at Nottingham Forest.

30 October 1984: Chelsea need a late Colin Lee equaliser to rescue a 2–2 draw at Walsall in the Milk Cup third round. Everton beat Manchester United for the second time in four days, 2–1 at Old Trafford. Ex-Evertonian John Gidman heads the winner into his own goal.

31 October 1984: Arsenal are knocked out of the Milk Cup, beaten 3–2 at Second Division leaders Oxford. David Langan scores the winner thanks to a mistake by Pat Jennings. Liverpool's 1–0 defeat at Tottenham is the first tie the holders have lost in the competition since the 1979–80 season. Improving Watford enjoy a comprehensive 4–0 win at Leeds.

2 November 1984: Manchester United beat Arsenal 4–2 at Old Trafford, the Gunners' third consecutive defeat in the space of seven days.

3 November 1984: Everton go top of the League by beating Leicester 3–0. Kerry Dixon scores a hat-trick as Chelsea fight back from two down to beat Coventry 6–2. A late Ronnie Whelan goal gives Liverpool victory at Stoke. In Division Three, bottom side Cambridge United beat Newport County 2–1, their first away win in 18 months.

6 November 1984: Chelsea brush aside Walsall in their Milk Cup third round replay, scoring three goals in the first 11 minutes without reply. A Howard Gayle goal in extra time is enough for Sunderland to knock out Nottingham Forest who have 18-year-old Paul Raynor sent off.

7 November 1984: Liverpool concede early in Lisbon but hang on to edge past Benfica 3–2 on aggregate and into the European Cup quarter-finals. QPR are stunned by Partizan in the UEFA Cup, losing on away goals following a 4–0 defeat in Belgrade, but Tottenham and Manchester United make it through, as do Everton in the Cup Winners' Cup.

10 November 1984: Everton stay top with a 1–0 win over West Ham at Upton Park. Manchester United and Tottenham also win away but Arsenal are held at home by Aston Villa. In the Third Division, Hull City come from 4–1 down to win 5–4 at Orient.

17 November 1984: FA Cup first round day produces its usual selection of surprise results. Altrincham win 1–0 at Blackpool and Northwich Victoria beat Crewe Alexandra 3–1 while seven other non-league clubs take league opposition to a replay. No such luck for Tow Law Town, beaten 7–2 at Bradford City, or Penrith, thrashed 9–0 by Burnley for whom Kevin Hird and Alan Taylor both score three. In Division One, leaders Everton beat bottom club Stoke 4–0 at Goodison Park.

20 November 1984: In the Milk Cup fourth round, Second Division Grimsby Town cause a shock by winning at Everton through a last minute header by Paul Wilkinson. Andy Blair scores a hat-trick of penalties in Sheffield Wednesday's 4–2 win over Luton. Non-league Enfield and Telford United win through in FA Cup replays but Kettering Town and Bangor City are knocked out.

21 November 1984: Kerry Dixon scores his second hat-trick of the month as Chelsea beat Manchester City 4–1 in the Milk Cup. In the FA Cup, Bognor Regis Town beat Swansea City 3–1 to reach the second round for the first time in their history.

24 November 1984: Sunderland beat Manchester United 3–2 in a dramatic match at Roker Park. Both sides have a player sent off and Clive Walker scores a hat-trick (including two penalties) after the home side had trailed 2–0, all in the first half. Oxford also come from two down to beat Leeds 5–2 at the top of the Second Division with John Aldridge scoring three. Two goals by John Wark against his former club Ipswich give Liverpool their first league win at home for three months. Brighton and Hove Albion score their first goal in six matches but are beaten 2–1 at home by Middlesbrough.

26 November 1984: FA Cup replay joy for Alliance Premier League side Dagenham who win 2–1 after extra time at Swindon Town.

27 November 1984: QPR and Southampton play out a goalless Milk Cup replay at Loftus Road. Steve Moran has an 85th minute penalty saved by Rs' keeper Peter Hucker.

28 November 1984: Tottenham beat Bohemians Prague 2–0 in the UEFA Cup third round but Manchester United are held 2–2 at home by Dundee United. Gordon Strachan scores a penalty but has a second saved by fellow Scot Hamish McAlpine.

1 December 1984: Manchester United and Arsenal narrow the gap on leaders Everton who are held 1–1 by Sheffield Wednesday and have top scorer Adrian Heath carried off with a serious knee injury. In Division Two, Portsmouth and Blackburn Rovers draw a top-of-the-table clash 2–2 at Fratton Park with the home side fighting back after gifting the visitors two own goals.

5 December 1984: Sunderland surprise Tottenham in the Milk Cup with a 2–1 replay win at White Hart Lane. Goalkeeper Chris Turner saves a Graham Roberts penalty. QPR finally put out Southampton 4–0 in their second replay.

8 December 1984: Tottenham move to within a point of Everton after coming from behind to beat Newcastle 3–1. The leaders are held 0–0 at QPR and have Pat Van Den Hauwe sent off along with Rangers' Simon Stainrod. Manchester United lose at Forest and Southampton beat Arsenal – only three points now separate the top five. Telford record the most eye-catching result in the FA Cup second round, a 4–1 win at Preston. Other non-league clubs through to round three are Burton Albion, winners at Aldershot, and Dagenham, who knock out Peterborough United.

9 December 1984: Independiente of Argentina beat Liverpool 1–0 to win the World Club Championship in Tokyo. 

12 December 1984: Manchester United win 3–2 at Dundee United (5–4 aggregate) and Tottenham draw 1–1 in Prague (3–1 aggregate) to ensure safe passage through to the UEFA Cup quarter-finals.

15 December 1984: Everton maintain their place at the top of the First Division with a 5–0 win over Nottingham Forest for whom Chris Fairclough is sent off and Gary Mills breaks a leg. Southampton lose 2–1 at Coventry, their first league defeat since 4 September.

21 December 1984: Liverpool's revival continues with a 2–0 win at QPR that moves them up to fifth in the table.

22 December 1984: Tottenham win 2–1 at Norwich to reclaim leadership of the First Division as Everton are beaten 4–3 at home by Chelsea for whom recent signing Gordon Davies scores a hat-trick. Two goals in the last two minutes by transfer listed Alan Biley give Portsmouth a 2–1 win over Oxford.

26 December 1984: Bottom of the First Division with only one win and eight points all season, Stoke stun Manchester United 2–1 at the Victoria Ground. Liverpool suffer a surprise home defeat to Leicester but Everton win at Sunderland. Tottenham stay top on goal difference despite being held at home by West Ham.

29 December 1984: The year ends with Tottenham heading the First Division after beating Sunderland 2–0. Everton win by the same score at Ipswich to stay on their heels. Blackburn top Division Two although a 3–1 home defeat to Huddersfield cuts their lead to three points while Bradford and Bury are both clear at the top of Divisions Three and Four respectively.

1 January 1985: Status quo maintained as Tottenham win at Arsenal and Everton beat Luton. Stoke suffer another pasting, this time 4–0 at Coventry. Peter Beardsley scores a hat-trick as Newcastle beat Sunderland 3–1. In Division Two, Fulham stage a remarkable fightback from 4–0 down to draw 4–4 at Portsmouth.

5 January 1985: FA Cup third round shocks include Orient's 2–1 win over West Bromwich Albion and Doncaster Rovers beating QPR 1–0. Burton are beaten 6–1 by Leicester at the Baseball Ground after their goalkeeper Paul Evans is left dazed by a missile thrown from the crowd with the score level at 1–1. The FA subsequently orders the match to be replayed. Trouble too at Highfield Road where Manchester City fans riot as their side go down 2–1 to Coventry. Telford knock out Third Division leaders Bradford but Dagenham are beaten at Carlisle United. Hereford, second in Division Four, hold Arsenal and Wigan Athletic draw at Chelsea after being two goals ahead. At White Hart Lane, Mark Aizlewood earns Charlton Athletic a replay with a scrambled equaliser after seeing his initial penalty saved by Ray Clemence. Luther Blissett scores four in Watford's 5–0 drubbing of Sheffield United.

8 January 1985: Fourth Division Darlington beat Middlesbrough 2–1 in an FA Cup replay at Feethams. The match is held up for 10 minutes during the second half following a pitch invasion.

9 January 1985: Only two FA Cup replays survive as cold weather begins to bite. Luton score two early goals on their way to a 3–2 win at Stoke while Nottingham Forest win 3–1 in extra time at Newcastle.

12 January 1985: Tottenham are held to a 2–2 draw at QPR and relinquish the league leadership to Everton who beat Newcastle 4–0. A frozen pitch causes Sunderland's match with Liverpool at Roker Park to be abandoned at half-time. Manchester United are beaten 1–0 by Coventry, their second successive home defeat, and lose captain Bryan Robson to a shoulder injury.

16 January 1985: Leicester win their replayed FA Cup tie with Burton 1–0 behind closed doors at Highfield Road. Norwich are the first team through to the semi-finals of the Milk Cup following a 1–0 win at Grimsby. Juventus beat Liverpool 2–0 in Turin to win the European Super Cup. Polish international striker Zbigniew Boniek scores both goals.

19 January 1985: Arctic conditions decimate today's fixture programme with only 10 matches played across the four divisions. Three survive in Division One – Liverpool beat Norwich 4–0 while Aston Villa win 3–0 at Coventry and Chelsea draw 1–1 with Arsenal. In the Second Division, Manchester City move into the top three by beating Wimbledon 3–0 and a Tommy Wright hat-trick helps Leeds to a 5–0 win over Notts County.

22 January 1985: The three times postponed FA Cup replay between Arsenal and Hereford finally results in a 7–2 win for the First Division side.

23 January 1985: Sunderland join Norwich in the Milk Cup semi-finals with a 1–0 win at Watford while QPR hold Ipswich to a goalless draw at Portman Road. In FA Cup replays, Tottenham, Huddersfield and Millwall all make it through to round four but Norwich and Birmingham must try again after drawing 1–1 at Carrow Road.

26 January 1985: Third Division York City cause the biggest FA Cup upset of the season – a last minute Keith Houchen penalty gives them victory over Arsenal at Bootham Crescent. Manchester United reserve goalkeeper Stephen Pears saves a Terry Gibson penalty in his side's 2–1 win over Coventry. In delayed third round replays, Blackburn beat Portsmouth 2–1 and Chelsea win 5–0 at Wigan with goal machine Kerry Dixon netting four. The Birmingham–Norwich marathon continues as the two sides draw a second replay 1–1 at St Andrew's.

27 January 1985: Ian Rush scores the only goal to give Liverpool victory over Tottenham in the heavyweight clash of the FA Cup fourth round.

28 January 1985: Ipswich win 2–1 at QPR in the Milk Cup but the fourth semi-finalist is still undecided as Chelsea are held 1–1 by Sheffield Wednesday. A goal credited to Steve Bruce at last sees Norwich overcome Birmingham in the FA Cup third round.

30 January 1985: Sheffield Wednesday and Chelsea draw a thrilling Milk Cup replay 4–4 at Hillsborough. Chelsea came from 3–0 down to lead 4–3 during normal time and then kicked off in both halves of extra time. In the FA Cup, Blackburn win at Oxford and Wimbledon beat Nottingham Forest in a replay. Last season, as a Third Division club, the Dons knocked Forest out of the Milk Cup.

2 February 1985: Everton beat Watford 4–0 to go four points clear of Tottenham, held 2–2 at Luton. The top four in Division Two are separated only by goal difference. Oxford lead the way after winning 1–0 at Carlisle, displacing Blackburn who draw 1–1 at Wimbledon. Manchester City and Birmingham complete the quartet after away wins at Crystal Palace and Huddersfield respectively.

4 February 1985: Telford, the last remaining non-league side in the FA Cup, beat Darlington 3–0 to book a fifth round tie at Everton. Chelsea are shocked 3–2 at home by Third Division promotion chasers Millwall.

6 February 1985: Mickey Thomas scores a last minute winner as Chelsea beat Sheffield Wednesday 2–1 at the third time of asking in the Milk Cup quarter-final.

9 February 1985: More bad weather hits today's fixture list with only 16 matches surviving the freeze. Manchester United are held 1–1 at Newcastle and miss the opportunity to make serious ground on Everton and Tottenham. Manchester City also slip up in Division Two, beaten 3–1 at home by Carlisle.

13 February 1985: Sunderland establish a 2–0 lead over Chelsea in the first leg of their Milk Cup semi-final. Two penalties by Colin West decide the match – he scores the first and converts a rebound after the second is saved by Eddie Niedzwiecki.

16 February 1985: Everton end Telford's FA Cup adventure with a 3–0 win at Goodison Park but York score an 86th minute equaliser to take Liverpool to a replay. Bradford extend their lead at the top of Division Three to 12 points with a 2–0 win at third placed Hull.

19 February 1985: Millwall make the FA Cup quarter-finals with a deserved 2–0 win over Leicester at The Den.

20 February 1985: Liverpool register a decisive 7–0 FA Cup replay win over York at Anfield with John Wark scoring a hat-trick.

23 February 1985: Two goals by Andy Gray – his first since September – give Everton an important 2–1 win at Leicester. Kenny Dalglish celebrates his 300th league appearance by scoring in Liverpool's 2–0 win over Stoke. A goal by Mich d'Avray gives Ipswich a slender 1–0 advantage from the first leg of their Milk Cup semi-final against Norwich.

24 February 1985: At the foot of the Second Division, Crystal Palace's relegation fears deepen as they suffer a 5–0 defeat at home to Wimbledon.

2 March 1985: Both sides miss a penalty as Everton draw 1–1 at Manchester United, enabling Tottenham to close the gap at the top to two points with a 1–0 win at Stoke. Manchester City replace Blackburn as leaders in Division Two with a 1–0 win at Ewood Park. Oxford are beaten 3–0 by Birmingham, their first league defeat at home in nearly a year. Charlton fight back from 3–0 down to win 5–3 against Barnsley for whom Ron Futcher scores a hat-trick and is later sent off.

4 March 1985: Over 100 people are arrested after serious crowd trouble disrupts the second leg of the Milk Cup semi-final between Chelsea and Sunderland. The Wearsiders win 3–2 to reach the final 5–2 on aggregate. In the FA Cup fifth round, Southampton suffer a surprise home defeat to Barnsley while a late goal by Alan Sunderland gives Ipswich a 3–2 win over Sheffield Wednesday.

6 March 1985: An Andy Gray hat-trick helps Everton to a comfortable win over Fortuna Sittard in the Cup Winners' Cup while Liverpool gain a useful 1–1 away draw with Austria Vienna in the European Cup. In the UEFA Cup, Manchester United narrowly beat Videoton but a Steve Perryman own goal against Real Madrid consigns Tottenham to their first ever home defeat in European competition. Norwich beat Ipswich 2–0 at Carrow Road to reach the Milk Cup final. In FA Cup replays, West Ham beat Wimbledon 5–1 with Tony Cottee scoring three while Watford and Luton draw 2–2 after extra time at Vicarage Road.

9 March 1985: Norman Whiteside scores a hat-trick as Manchester United make the FA Cup semi-finals with a 4–2 win over West Ham. Ipswich take Everton to a replay with a 2–2 draw at Goodison Park. Luton beat Watford 1–0 to reach the sixth round. Midfielder Wayne Turner scores the only goal on his 24th birthday.

10 March 1985: Liverpool win 4–0 at Barnsley in the FA Cup with Ian Rush notching up yet another hat-trick.

12 March 1985: A 2–1 win at Tottenham pushes Manchester United back into contention for the league title. Three players are sent off in the goalless draw between Stoke and West Bromwich Albion.

13 March 1985: Another explosion of football violence occurs as Millwall hooligans riot before, during and after their team's FA Cup quarter-final tie at Luton which ends in a 1–0 win for the home side. Everton complete the semi-final line-up with a 1–0 replay win at Ipswich.

15 March 1985: On his return from injury, Bryan Robson scores shortly after coming on as a substitute in Manchester United's 2–2 draw at West Ham.

16 March 1985: Tottenham beat Liverpool at Anfield for the first time since 1912 to move level on points with leaders Everton. Garth Crooks scores the only goal in the 71st minute. Sunderland win 3–1 at Norwich in a dress rehearsal for next weekend's Milk Cup final.

20 March 1985: A mixed night for English clubs in Europe. Liverpool and Everton make it through to their respective semi-finals but Tottenham and Manchester United are knocked out of the UEFA Cup. Spurs have Steve Perryman sent off in their goalless draw at the Bernabéu and United lose on penalties to Videoton.

23 March 1985: Osvaldo Ardiles marks his first appearance of the season with the opening goal in Tottenham's 5–1 win over Southampton. Everton beat Arsenal 2–0 to virtually extinguish the Gunners' waning championship hopes. Hat-tricks for Manchester United's Mark Hughes against Aston Villa and John Wark for Liverpool at West Bromwich Albion. In Division Two, Oxford move up to second with a 3–0 win over leaders Manchester City.

24 March 1985: Norwich win the Milk Cup. The significant action takes place in the space of five minutes at the start of the second half as Gordon Chisholm deflects an Asa Hartford shot into his own net for the only goal and Sunderland's Clive Walker misses a penalty.

30 March 1985: Two goals by reserve midfielder Kevin Richardson give Everton a 2–1 win at Southampton which takes them three points clear of Tottenham, who lose 2–0 at home to Aston Villa. Manchester City's lead in Division Two is cut to two points after a 2–2 draw with bottom club Cardiff. Oxford, Birmingham and Blackburn all win while Portsmouth draw at Shrewsbury.

31 March 1985: Manchester United stay in the championship race as a Frank Stapleton header gives them a 1–0 win at Anfield.

2 April 1985: Watford rout West Ham 5–0 in an important game at the foot of the First Division. In Division Two, Gordon Owen scores a hat-trick as Barnsley beat Oxford 3–0.

3 April 1985: In a match touted as the "title decider", Everton beat Tottenham 2–1 at White Hart Lane. Andy Gray and Trevor Steven score in each half to put Everton in control before Graham Roberts pulls a goal back. Neville Southall denies the home side a point with a breathtaking late save from Mark Falco. The win takes Everton four points clear with two matches in hand on Manchester United who leapfrog Spurs into second after a 2–1 win over Leicester. Ian Rush scores after 52 seconds to set Liverpool on course for a 3–0 win at Sunderland.

6 April 1985: Everton beat Sunderland 4–1 to maintain their lead on the chasing pack. Manchester United hammer Stoke 5–0 but Tottenham are held to a 1–1 draw at West Ham.

8 April 1985: Sunderland drop into the relegation zone following their goalless draw with Newcastle and away victories for Ipswich and Luton. West Ham are drawn further into the mire after a 4–2 defeat at QPR. In Division Two, Portsmouth move up to second by winning 3–1 at Fulham as Manchester City are beaten at home by Leeds.

9 April 1985: Manchester United suffer a major setback in their pursuit of leaders Everton as they slip to a 1–0 defeat at Sheffield Wednesday.

10 April 1985: Liverpool virtually book their place in next month's European Cup final with a 4–0 win over Panathinaikos. In the Cup Winners' Cup, Everton come away from the first leg of their semi-final against Bayern Munich with an encouraging goalless draw.

13 April 1985: FA Cup holders Everton reach the final by beating Luton 2–1 at Villa Park. An 85th minute Kevin Sheedy free kick cancels out Ricky Hill's first half strike and Derek Mountfield scores the winner near the end of extra time. In the other semi-final at Goodison Park, Liverpool twice come from behind to take Manchester United to a replay. The situation at the foot of Division One tightens further with Sunderland's 1–0 win at Coventry the most notable result. In Division Two, a David Geddis hat-trick helps Birmingham to a 3–1 win at Fratton Park which takes the Blues above Pompey into second.

16 April 1985: Cambridge become the first team to be relegated following a 2–1 defeat at Millwall. The Us have won only seven of their last 82 league matches.

17 April 1985: Manchester United beat Liverpool 2–1 in a stirring FA Cup semi-final replay at Maine Road. Tottenham's lingering title hopes suffer another blow as Arsenal beat them 2–0 at White Hart Lane, Spurs' fourth defeat in their last five home matches.

20 April 1985: Leaders Everton beat bottom side Stoke 2–0 at the Victoria Ground. Tottenham lose at home again, 3–2 to Ipswich. Barely two years after almost going out of business, Oxford stand on the brink of promotion to Division One after beating Oldham 5–2 with leading scorer John Aldridge bagging a hat-trick.

21 April 1985: Luton climb out of the relegation zone with a 2–1 win over Manchester United, a result which all but hands Everton the title and confirms Stoke's relegation. The Potters have accumulated just three wins and 17 points from 35 league matches.

23 April 1985: Bradford win 4–0 at Cambridge to clinch promotion from Division Three while Hull look like joining them following a 4–1 win at Preston that gives them a cushion of 11 points over fourth placed Bristol City.

24 April 1985: A Mark Lawrenson goal in Greece completes a comfortable 5–0 aggregate win for Liverpool over Panathinaikos in the European Cup. Their opponents in next month's final will be Italian giants Juventus. Everton reach their first European final with a 3–1 win over Bayern Munich at Goodison Park in the Cup Winners' Cup. Oxford beat Shrewsbury 1–0 and are promoted to Division One.

27 April 1985: Everton beat Norwich 3–0 and need only five points from their remaining seven matches to be certain of the title. Coventry boost their survival hopes with a 2–1 win over West Bromwich Albion but Sunderland remain in deep trouble despite holding Manchester United to a 2–2 draw at Old Trafford. Norman Whiteside misses a penalty. At Stamford Bridge, Chelsea introduce their new 'electric fence' aimed at combating hooliganism. They draw 1–1 with Tottenham and the fence is not switched on. Birmingham's 1–0 win at Barnsley puts them on the verge of an immediate return to the First Division but the third promotion spot is still up for grabs. Blackburn lose 1–0 at Charlton so Manchester City move into the driving seat with a 2–1 win at Portsmouth while Leeds keep their faint hopes alive by beating Oxford 1–0.

4 May 1985: Many promotion and relegation issues remain undecided on the penultimate Saturday of the League season. In Division One, six of the bottom seven lose, the exception being Luton who beat Arsenal 3–1. Sunderland look doomed following a 4–0 home defeat by Aston Villa. Birmingham and Hull confirm their promotions while Darlington are poised to join Chesterfield, Bury and Blackpool in going up from Division Four.

6 May 1985: Everton beat QPR 2–0 and are league champions for the first time since 1970. Sunderland lose 2–0 at Leicester and are relegated. Wolves go down to Division Three despite beating Huddersfield 2–1 in front of a crowd of 4422, the lowest ever for a league match at Molineux. The second half at Notts County is delayed by half an hour as Manchester City fans riot with their team 3–0 behind. County eventually run out 3–2 winners to improve their chances of avoiding relegation and deal a blow to City's promotion hopes.

11 May 1985: A black day for English football. 56 people are burnt to death and more than 200 others injured at Valley Parade, Bradford in a fire caused by a discarded cigarette which set light to waste beneath the wooden main stand. The speed with which the blaze spread was astonishing. Tragedy also at Birmingham where rioting Leeds fans hold up play and later cause the collapse of a brick wall, killing a 14-year-old boy. Manchester City beat Charlton 5–1 and clinch promotion to the First Division ahead of Portsmouth on goal difference while at the other end Notts County and Cardiff are relegated. Oxford secure the Second Division title with a 4–0 win over Barnsley. Millwall are promoted from Division Three but Preston and Orient go down to be joined by either Swansea or Burnley. Everton's unbeaten run of 28 league and cup matches comes to end as they go down to a Garry Birtles goal at Nottingham Forest.

14 May 1985: Norwich win 2–1 at Chelsea in their final match of the season, meaning Coventry – held 0–0 at Ipswich – must win their remaining three matches to stay up and send the Canaries or West Ham down instead.

15 May 1985: Everton lift the European Cup Winners' Cup with a 3–1 win over Rapid Vienna in Rotterdam. Second half goals from Sharp, Steven and Sheedy clinch their second trophy of the season and keep alive hopes of a 'treble' with the FA Cup final to follow.

17 May 1985: West Ham secure their First Division status with a 1–0 win at Ipswich while Coventry win by the same score at Stoke to retain a chance of survival. Swansea hold Bristol City to a goalless draw, a result which relegates Burnley to the Fourth Division. Both they and Lancashire rivals Preston will play at this level next season for the first time in their histories.

18 May 1985: Manchester United win the FA Cup for the sixth time, beating Everton 1–0 thanks to a goal by Norman Whiteside in extra time. United played with only 10 men following the 77th minute dismissal of defender Kevin Moran for a foul on Peter Reid, the first ever sending-off in an FA Cup final.

20 May 1985: After sinking as low as 20th earlier in the season, Liverpool clinch the runners-up spot with a 3–0 win at West Ham in their penultimate League match.

23 May 1985: An 84th minute goal by Brian Kilcline gives Coventry a dramatic 1–0 win over Luton and edges them closer to First Division safety. Everton beat Liverpool 1–0, their third such win over the deposed champions this season. John Wark misses a penalty.

26 May 1985: Coventry beat Everton 4–1 to complete their 'great escape'. Milk Cup winners Norwich are relegated despite a haul of 49 points, the highest ever recorded by a team relegated from the top flight.

28 May 1985: Luton beat an understrength Everton 2–0 in the final match of the League season.

29 May 1985: 39 spectators, most of them Italian, are killed when a wall collapses at the European Cup final between Liverpool and Juventus at the Heysel Stadium in Brussels. Despite the tragedy, the match is played and Michel Platini scores from a penalty as Juventus win 1–0. UEFA later bans all English clubs indefinitely from European competitions as a result of the disaster. Just hours before kick-off, Joe Fagan had announced that he would be retiring as Liverpool manager after two seasons in charge.

National team

European football

FA Cup

Manchester United won their second FA Cup in three years after a Norman Whiteside goal gave them an extra-time 1–0 victory over Everton at Wembley. Defender Kevin Moran became the first player to be sent off in an FA Cup final at Wembley when he brought down Peter Reid in what he insisted was a misjudged tackle. United's triumph ended Everton's hopes of completing a treble of trophies – they had already lifted the league title and UEFA Cup Winners Cup. Millwall fans rioted in their 6th round match against Luton Town, causing Luton to ban away fans from their ground.  Non-League Telford United collected four League scalps on their way to the fifth round proper, the joint-best run by a non-league side until Lincoln City reached the quarter-finals in 2016-17.

League Cup

Norwich City became the first club to win a major trophy in a relegation season as they lifted the League Cup after beating Sunderland, who went down with them to the Second Division. This occurrence would not be repeated for some 26 years when Birmingham City suffered the same fate; also relegated after lifting the League Cup earlier in the season.

Football League

First Division
Everton won their first league title for 15 years with four matches to spare, and also won the European Cup Winners' Cup to claim their first ever European trophy, but were denied a treble when they lost to Manchester United in the final of the FA Cup. Liverpool endured their first trophyless season for a decade, although they did finish runners-up in the league, reached the FA Cup semi-finals and were on the losing side in the European Cup final - a match marred by a riot before kick-off in which 39 spectators died. The British government swiftly banned all English clubs from competing in the following season's European competitions, before UEFA placed an indefinite ban on English clubs playing in Europe and ordered Liverpool to serve an extra three years when the ban on other clubs was lifted.

Tottenham Hotspur enjoyed another good season, topping the First Division over Christmas before finishing third in the final table. Southampton continued to compete with the bigger clubs and finished fifth. Newly promoted Chelsea, Sheffield Wednesday and Newcastle United enjoyed a strong return to the First Division, finishing sixth, eighth and 14th respectively.

Stoke City went down in bottom place with one of the worst First Division records ever - a mere three wins from 42 games and 17 points from a possible 126. Sunderland, runners-up in the League Cup, had a dismal season in the league and were relegated in second place from bottom. Norwich City went down with 49 points (more than any other relegated First Division side) but the blow was cushioned by victory in the League Cup. QPR, who had finished fifth a year earlier, avoided relegation by one place and one point. Player-manager Frank Sibley was dismissed after one season to be replaced by Jim Smith of Oxford United. Ipswich Town's decline since the departure of Bobby Robson to the England job three years earlier continued as the Suffolk club finished 17th, with most of Robson's fine team now gone.

Second Division
23 years after joining the Football League, Oxford United reached the First Division by clinching the Second Division title and securing a second successive promotion. The only downside to their promotion was the departure soon afterwards of manager Jim Smith to QPR, leaving Maurice Evans to try to build an Oxford side capable of defying the odds and surviving at the highest level. Birmingham City achieved an instant return to the First Division after keeping faith in manager Ron Saunders, while Manchester City won promotion on goal difference ahead of Portsmouth. Blackburn Rovers, absent from the First Division since 1966, missed out on promotion by a single point, while just two points kept Brighton out of the First Division.

Wimbledon, in their first season as a Second Division club and only their eighth in the Football League, finished a secure 12th.

Notts County and debt-ridden Wolverhampton Wanderers suffered a second successive relegation, while Cardiff City returned to the Third Division after just two years away. Middlesbrough, another club faced with mounting debts, narrowly avoided relegation to the Third Division for the first time in 20 years.

Third Division
Bradford City's promotion glory and Third Division title triumph ended in tragedy with the death of 56 spectators (all but two of them Bradford fans) in a stadium fire on the final day of the season at home to Lincoln City. The second promotion place went to Millwall, who had a happy end to the season just weeks after they had made the headlines for all the wrong reasons after hundreds of their fans ran riot in an FA Cup tie at Luton. The last promotion place was sealed by Hull City, while Gillingham and Bristol City just missed out.

Derby County failed to mount a serious challenge for an immediate return to the Second Division, although their seventh-place finish was hardly disastrous. Newly promoted York City finished eighth in the league but made headlines in the FA Cup by beating Arsenal in the fourth round and taking Liverpool to a replay in the fifth.

In an era where consecutive relegations were a regular event, Cambridge United were rooted to the bottom of the Third Division with just four wins, 21 points and a joint league record of 33 defeats. Orient also went down, but the biggest news at the lower end of this divisions was the relegation of Preston North End and Burnley to the Fourth Division for the very first time - an incredible low for two clubs with a host of league titles and FA Cup wins to their name, with Burnley's most recent title win coming as recently as 1960, although Preston's only two league titles had come in the league's first two seasons nearly a century earlier and their last FA Cup win was in 1938.

Debt-ridden Swansea City, who had finished sixth in the First Division in 1982, narrowly avoided a third successive relegation.

Fourth Division
Chesterfield sealed the Fourth Division title, with runners-up spot going to a Blackpool side who had recently been saved from closure. Former Tottenham Hotspur star Cyril Knowles achieved his first success as a manager by guiding Darlington to promotion in third place, while the last promotion spot went to Bury, who finished seven points ahead of Hereford United.

Torquay United, Northampton Town, Stockport County and Halifax Town propped up the Fourth Division but were re-elected to the league.

Top goalscorers

First Division
Kerry Dixon (Chelsea) and Gary Lineker (Leicester City) – 24 goals
Second Division
John Aldridge (Oxford United) – 30 goals
Third Division
Tommy Tynan (Plymouth Argyle) – 31 goals
Fourth Division
John Clayton (Tranmere Rovers) – 31 goals

Non-league football
The divisional champions of the major non-League competitions were:

Awards 
 Everton's team included PFA Players' Player of the Year Peter Reid and FWA Footballer of the Year Neville Southall.
 PFA Young Player of the Year was Manchester United's Welsh striker Mark Hughes, who helped his side lift the FA Cup.

Notable managers 
 Howard Kendall brought glory to Everton as they lifted the league championship trophy and the Cup Winners' Cup.
 Ron Atkinson won his second FA Cup in three years with Manchester United.
 Jim Smith brought First Division football to Oxford United less than a quarter of a century after they were elected to the league.
 Ken Brown guided Norwich City to League Cup glory which compensated for their relegation to the Second Division.
 Howard Wilkinson guided newly promoted Sheffield Wednesday to seventh place in the First Division in their first top division season for more than a decade.
 Ron Saunders took Birmingham City back into the First Division at the first time of asking.
 Trevor Cherry guided Bradford City to Third Division championship glory.
 Former Arsenal player George Graham achieved managerial success with Millwall as they won promotion to the Second Division.
 Brian Horton took Hull City to promotion in the Third Division.
 Cyril Knowles (who played for Tottenham in the late 1960s and early 1970s), enjoyed success in management by getting Darlington promoted to the Third Division.

Notable debutants

25 August 1984: Dale Gordon, 17-year-old winger, makes his debut for Norwich City in a 3–3 away draw with Liverpool in the First Division.

26 December 1984: Nigel Clough, 18-year-old striker and son of manager Brian Clough, makes his debut for Nottingham Forest in a 2–1 home win over Ipswich Town in the First Division.

23 March 1985: Martin Allen, 19-year-old midfielder, makes his debut for Queen's Park Rangers in a 2–0 away defeat against Luton Town in the First Division.

13 April 1985: Paul Gascoigne, 17-year-old midfielder, makes his debut for Newcastle United in a 1-0 First Division home win over Queen's Park Rangers.

11 May 1985: Dennis Wise, 18-year-old winger, makes his debut for Wimbledon in 2–1 home win over Cardiff City in the Second Division.

Deaths
 14 August 1984 – Mike Barrett, 24, Bristol Rovers winger. Died as a result of cancer.
 6 November 1984 – Micky Cave, 35, former Torquay United, AFC Bournemouth and York City midfielder. Died from accidental carbon monoxide poisoning.
 27 December 1984 - Leslie Compton, 72, who played senior football and cricket between 1930 and 1956, died from a diabetes related illness. He spent his entire footballing career at Arsenal and was capped twice for England in 1950 at the age of 38.
 9 March 1985 - Harry Catterick, 65, manager of Everton from 1961 to 1973, during which time they won two league titles and an FA Cup. Died from a heart attack at Goodison Park after watching Everton draw 2-2 with Ipswich Town in the quarter-final of the FA Cup.

References